Happidrome is a 1943 British comedy film directed by Philip Brandon and starring Harry Korris, Robbie Vincent and Cecil Fredericks. It was a spin-off from the Happidrome BBC radio series which was popular at the time. The film was made at the Riverside Studios in Hammersmith, and produced by the musical star Jack Buchanan. The sets were designed by the art director William Hemsley.

Synopsis
Mr Lovejoy, a struggling actor-manager returns to a small provincial town with plans to put on a show. Despite having debts there during the previous visit, he is cunningly able to keep his show on the road and gains free advertising in a newspaper by announcing that local talent will be cast. In the meantime he acquires two incompetent assistants, Enoch and Rambsbottom, and Bunty Meadows, an eager would-be star also wangles her way into the company. A statuesque but domineering Russian prima donna also joins the cast.

Bunty's determination to become a leading lady has a disastrous effect on the opening night which is supposed to be a serious play about Ancient Rome, but quickly descends into a total farce. With the audience extremely amused, the show is quickly rebilled as a comedy.

Cast
 Harry Korris as Mr Lovejoy
 Robbie Vincent as Enoch
 Cecil Fredericks as Ramsbottom
 Bunty Meadows as Bunty Mossup
 Lisa Lee as Tanya / Josephine
 Jennie Gregson as Mrs Bane
 Muriel Zillah as Muriel 
 Connie Creighton as Connie 
 Marie Lawson as Marie 
 Olga Stevenson as Miss D'Orsay  
 Joss Ambler as Mr Mossup
 Valentine Dunn as Mrs Mossup
 Bryan Herbert as Newspaper editor
 Arthur Hambling as Jones Jnr. 
 Leslie 'Hutch' Hutchinson as himself 
 Cairoli Brothers as Themselves
 Billy Wells as Ivan

References

Bibliography
 Richards, Jeffrey. Films and British National Identity: from Dickens to Dad's Army. Manchester University Press, 1997.

External links

1943 films
1943 comedy films
British comedy films
British black-and-white films
Films shot at Riverside Studios
Films set in England
Films about theatre
Metro-Goldwyn-Mayer films
1940s English-language films
1940s British films